The Zénith de Lille (or Zénith Arena) is a multi-purpose indoor arena in Lille, France. Designed by the Dutch architect Rem Koolhaas with Cecil Balmond and inaugurated in 1994, the Zénith Arena is a part of the cultural complex Lille Grand Palais which includes two other spaces: a Congress Center and Exhibition halls. Rem Koolhaas surrounded himself with Renz van Luxemburg for the acoustic studies, dUCKS scéno for the scenography and Arup Group for the engineering studies. Its ability to seat up to 7,000 people makes it one of the largest venues in Lille. The closest métro station is Lille Grand Palais.

See also
Le Zénith

External links
Zénith de Lille

Music venues in France
Indoor arenas in France
Sports venues in Lille